Bård Vonen (born 15 November 1955) is a Norwegian épée fencer. He competed at the 1976 and 1984 Summer Olympics.

References

External links
 

1955 births
Living people
Norwegian male épée fencers
Olympic fencers of Norway
Fencers at the 1976 Summer Olympics
Fencers at the 1984 Summer Olympics
Sportspeople from Bergen
20th-century Norwegian people